Stone Point may refer to:

 Stone Point, Hampshire
 Stone Point, Antarctica
 Stone Point Capital, a private equity firm